Selkirk Lift Bridge is a Vertical-Lift Bridge in Selkirk, Manitoba spanning the Red River. The Canadian government built the bridge as a work relief project during the Great Depression.

History

Necessity for the bridge 
Before 1934, the residents of Selkirk, and the nearby rural municipality of St. Clements wished to have a bridge connecting the two towns, instead of relying on a busy ferry service to traverse the Red River. However, in 1934, the Canadian government allotted $40 million to a national infrastructure program to uplift workers unemployed due to the Great Depression. Arthur J. Taunton, an assistant engineer for the Federal Department of Public Works of Winnipeg placed the location of the bridge in Eaton Avenue, in Selkirk. However, the Province of Manitoba refused to fund the project, forcing the bridge to act as a toll bridge, and a petition against the formation of a toll bridge was sent to the government on June 16, 1936.

Ownership and construction 
Macaw and Macdonalds were chosen as the contractors for the project, the superstructure was awarded to Dominion Bridge of Winnipeg, and on March 31, 1935, the bridge was constructed at a cost of $250,000. As the bridge was being built, no government entity wished to take ownership of the bridge, as that would mean purchasing for its cost and maintenance. Due to confusion and unwillingness to own and operate the bridge, the bridge was raised above its deck to deter any crossing, and timbers were placed across the bridge. A local man named Ed Maloney lowered the bridge, and opened it to traffic. Later, the bridge was raised by a bit allowing only pedestrians to cross and disabling vehicles to go through the bridge, but was later lowered again. The bridge was administered by the Rural Municipality of St. Clements, Selkirk, but ownership was transferred to the Province of Manitoba when the bridge was converted into Manitoba Provincial Road 204.

Closure and reopening 
During the 1970s, due to the age of the bridge, multiple repairs were completed on the bridge. In the year 1990, an official of the Provincial Highways Department described the bridge's condition as being in a "disgraceful condition". On January 6, 1992, the bridge closed for repairs woth $2.8 million, and was reoponed on September 12, 1992.

Image gallery

See also 

 List of vertical-lift bridges
 Vertical-lift bridge
 Moveable bridge

References 
 

Vertical lift bridges
Vertical lift bridges in Canada